Nuha al-Radi (January 27, 1941 in Baghdad – August 30, 2004 in Beirut) was an Iraqi diarist, ceramicist and painter and noted author of the Baghdad Diaries which vividly recounts the horror of living through the first Gulf War.

Life and career

She was born into a distinguished Iraqi family which included Mahmud Shevket Pasha, Prime Minister of the Ottoman Empire. In 1919, her father Mohammed Selim al-Radi was one of the first Iraqis to be educated in the United States when he studied agriculture in Texas. He married Suad Abbas, became an Iraqi diplomat and was appointed ambassador to Iran in 1947 and then to India from 1949 to 1958, where Nuha al-Radi grew up. She was educated at private English-speaking schools in Delhi and Simla, except for a brief spell in 1956 when she attended a boarding school in Alexandria to improve her Arabic, but this was interrupted by the Suez Crisis.

After the Iraqi Revolution broke out in 1958 and the monarchy was overthrown, Nuha al-Radi became a ceramist, having joined the Byam Shaw School of Art in London and later worked with Chelsea Pottery. She returned to Baghdad and exhibited in Iraq, Britain and Europe. In  1969, her family moved to Beirut and where she graduated in liberal arts from the American University in Beirut She also taught there and continued to work and exhibit as a ceramist, but the outbreak of the Lebanese civil war forced her to return to Baghdad.

In 1991, after the first three days of bombing in Operation Desert Storm, she began writing a diary in English. This was first published as "Baghdad Diary” and then translated into Dutch. She continued updating it until 1996. In 1998 her eyewitness account of the Gulf War and its aftermath was published as "Baghdad Diaries" and translated into several languages. The 2003 edition of the book includes a postscript with remarks on the American invasion of Iraq.

She died in 2004 from leukemia. She and her family believed that the leukemia may have been caused by the depleted uranium allies had fired at the tanks during the Gulf war.

Work
Her works have been exhibited throughout the Arab world. 
Her ceramic works are often inspired by Iraqi folklore.

She has been praised for offering a uniquely female perspective on the male-centred business of war, occupation and economic sanctions in both her writing and her artwork.

Publications
Her book, Baghdad Diaries recounts the horrific experiences of living through the first Gulf war.

Select list of publications
 Baghdad Diaries: A Woman's Chronicles of War and Peace, Vintage Books, (1998) 2003

See also
 Iraqi art
 Islamic art
 List of Iraqi artists
 List of Iraqi women artists

References 

 Muneeza Shamsie, Independent scholar. "Nuha al-Radi." The Literary Encyclopedia. 10 Feb. 2003. The Literary Dictionary Company. 17 December 2006. <http://www.litencyc.com/php/speople.php?rec=true&UID=5215>

1941 births
2004 deaths
Alumni of the Byam Shaw School of Art
American University of Beirut alumni
20th-century Iraqi painters
20th-century women artists
Artist authors
Artists from Baghdad
Deaths from leukemia
Iraqi contemporary artists
Iraqi diarists
Iraqi writers
Iraqi women artists
Iraqi women writers
War artists
Women diarists
Iraqi women painters
20th-century diarists